Mac OS Gujarati is a character set developed by Apple Inc. based on IS 13194:1991 (ISCII-91).

Code page layout
The following table shows the Mac OS Gujarati encoding. Each character is shown with its equivalent Unicode code point. Only the second half of the table (code points 128–255) is shown, the first half (code points 0–127) being the same as Mac OS Roman.

Byte pairs and ISCII-related features are described in the mapping file.

References

Character sets
Gujarati